Matthew Bulow is an American paralympic athlete and sitting volleyball player. He participated at the 1988, 1992 and 1996 Summer Paralympics.

Life and career 
Bulow is the son of Frank Bulow. He had his right leg removed after being diagnosed with bone cancer at the age of fourteen. After it was removed, he wore a prosthetic leg. Bulow attended  Tennessee Technological University, where he earned his bachelor's degree. While there he was a member of the Golden Eagles tennis team, which won the 1988 U.S. National Amputee tennis championship.

Bulow represented the United States at the 1988 Summer Paralympics. He won the bronze medal in the men's long jump A4/A9 event, and the bronze medal in the men's 4×100 m relay A2/A4–7 event, along with Ronnie Alsup, Rick Hoang and Dennis Oehler. He also competed in the men's 100 m and 200 m A4/A9 events, and the men's sitting volleyball.

Bulow also competed at the 1992 Summer Paralympics, winning bronze medals in the men's long jump J2 event, and (along with Thomas Bourgeois, Dennis Oehler and Douglas Collier) in the men's 4×100 m relay T42–46. He competed in the men's 100 m and 200 m TS2 events, and the men's long jump F44 event at the 1996 Summer Paralympics.

Bulow trained as a prosthetist at the Feinberg School of Medicine. He resides in Nashville, Tennessee.

References

External links 

Living people
Place of birth missing (living people)
Year of birth missing (living people)
American sitting volleyball players
Athletes (track and field) at the 1988 Summer Paralympics
Volleyball players at the 1988 Summer Paralympics
Medalists at the 1988 Summer Paralympics
Paralympic volleyball players of the United States
Athletes (track and field) at the 1992 Summer Paralympics
Medalists at the 1992 Summer Paralympics
Athletes (track and field) at the 1996 Summer Paralympics
Medalists at the 1996 Summer Paralympics
Paralympic medalists in athletics (track and field)
Paralympic track and field athletes of the United States
Paralympic bronze medalists for the United States
Tennessee Technological University alumni
Feinberg School of Medicine alumni
American male tennis players
American male long jumpers